is a Japanese biathlete. She competed at the 2014 Winter Olympics in Sochi, in the individual, sprint and relay.

References

1987 births
Living people
Biathletes at the 2014 Winter Olympics
Japanese female biathletes
Olympic biathletes of Japan